is a Japanese football player.

Shibamura previously played for Nagano Parceiro in the Japan Football League and Osotspa Saraburi F.C. and the Royal Thai Army in the Thai Premier League. In March, 2011 he signed a contract with the Latvian Higher League club FB Gulbene. On July 7, 2011, he joined to FK Ventspils. In February 2012 he signed a contract with the Ukrainian club FC Hoverla-Zakarpattia Uzhhorod for two years.

In summer 2015 he joined Slovenian Second League side NŠ Drava Ptuj.

Awards and honours

Club
FK Ventspils
Latvian Higher League: 1
 2011

Latvian Football Cup: 1
 2010-11

FC Hoverla Uzhhorod
Ukrainian First League: 1
 2011-12

References

External links
 

1986 births
Living people
People from Gamagōri
Japanese footballers
J2 League players
Yasuhiro Kato
Yasuhiro Kato
FB Gulbene players
FK Ventspils players
Motor Lublin players
Expatriate footballers in Latvia
Japanese expatriate sportspeople in Latvia
Japanese expatriate sportspeople in Ukraine
FC Hoverla Uzhhorod players
Ukrainian First League players
Expatriate footballers in Ukraine
OKS Stomil Olsztyn players
Expatriate footballers in Poland
Japanese expatriate footballers
NK Drava Ptuj (2004) players
Expatriate footballers in Slovenia
Association football midfielders